3-pounder gun, 3-pounder, 3-pdr or QF 3-pdr is an abbreviation typically referring to a gun which fired a projectile weighing approximately 3 pounds. It may refer to :
The Grasshopper cannon : of the 18th century
QF 3-pounder Hotchkiss : Hotchkiss 47 mm naval gun used by many countries from 1885
QF 3-pounder Nordenfelt : Nordenfelt 47 mm naval gun used by many countries from 1885
QF 3-pounder Vickers : British Vickers 47 mm naval gun of World War I and World War II
OQF 3-pounder gun : used to arm interwar Vickers Medium Tanks

See also
:Category:47 mm artillery